The 2021 Samford Bulldogs football team represented Samford University in the 2021 NCAA Division I FCS football season as a member of the Southern Conference (SoCon). The Bulldogs were led by seventh-year head coach Chris Hatcher and played their home games at Seibert Stadium in Homewood, Alabama.

Schedule

References

Samford
Samford Bulldogs football seasons
Samford Bulldogs football